Carbonilla is a genus of bristle flies in the family Tachinidae. There is at least one described species in Carbonilla, C. luteicosta.

References

Dexiinae
Diptera of Asia
Tachinidae genera